M class or M-class may refer to:

Military
 M-class cruiser, a planned German light cruiser class
 M-class destroyer, several classes of destroyer
 Admiralty M-class destroyer, a class of British destroyers built 1913–1916 and served in World War I
 M-class, British destroyers starting with the letter M of the L and M-class destroyer, launched 1939–1942 and served in World War II
 Marcílio Dias-class destroyer, Brazilian destroyers built during World War II
 Karel Doorman-class frigate, of the Royal Netherlands Navy
 M-class minesweeper, several classes of minesweeper
 M-class minesweeper (Germany), a class of minesweepers of the World War II German Kriegsmarine
 M-class minesweeper (Netherlands), a class of minesweepers of the Royal Netherlands Navy built after World War I
 Abercrombie-class monitor, a British WWI class of monitor gunships
 M-class submarine, several classes of submarine
 British M-class submarine
 United States M-class submarine

Transportation
 Mercedes-Benz M-Class, an automobile
 M-segment, a European vehicle size class
 NZR M class locomotives
 Pennsylvania Railroad class M1, locomotives
 Victorian Railways M class, steam locomotives
 Victorian Railways M class (diesel-hydraulic), shunting locomotives
 OOCL M-class container ship, a class of large container ships operated by Orient Overseas Container Line
 Maersk M-class container ship, a class of large container ships operated by Maersk Line

Astronomy
 M class, a stellar classification
 M class, a class of solar flare

See also
 Class M (disambiguation)
 M type (disambiguation)